Ruth Mangue (born 23 June 1975) is an Equatoguinean sprinter. She competed in the women's 200 metres at the 1992 Summer Olympics.

References

External links
 

1975 births
Living people
Athletes (track and field) at the 1992 Summer Olympics
Equatoguinean female sprinters
Olympic athletes of Equatorial Guinea
Place of birth missing (living people)
Olympic female sprinters